Prothelymna is a genus of moths belonging to the subfamily Tortricinae of the family Tortricidae.

Species
Prothelymna antiquana (Walker, 1863)
Prothelymna niphostrota Meyrick, 1907

See also
List of Tortricidae genera

References

External links
tortricidae.com

Tortricidae genera